Ohayocon is a three-day anime convention typically held during January in Columbus, Ohio, at the Hyatt Regency Columbus and the Greater Columbus Convention Center.

Programming
The convention typically offers an anime music contest, an artists' alley, concerts, costume contests, a dealers' room, a formal ball, a masquerade, musical events, panel discussions, a rave, table-top games, tournaments, video gaming, and workshops.

History
In 2007, the Midwest premiere of Robotech: The Shadow Chronicles occurred at the Arena Grand Theatre during Ohayocon. In 2010, crowding was a problem during the rave due to space issues. The convention shared the Columbus Convention Center with other events and only used about one-fourth of the available space. The convention's dance was moved to the convention center ballroom in 2012 to alleviate crowding issues. Ohayocon began using wristbands instead of badges to control unpaid attendance in 2014. During Ohayocon 2015, a transgender teen disappeared during the rave on Saturday night. The teen was attempting to run away and was later found safe in downtown Columbus on Tuesday. The Columbus Convention Center was undergoing construction during Ohayocon 2017, and the convention continued to use wristbands instead of badges. 

Ohayocon 2021 was cancelled due to the COVID-19 pandemic, but a virtual event was held in its place. The 2022 convention had an attendance cap of 17,000 and events like the dance were not held. Ohayocon also had COVID-19 policies that included masks and testing or vaccination. The dance and formal ball returned in 2023.  Ohayocon continued to have COVID-19 protocols that included masks and testing or vaccination.

Event history

References

External links

Ohayocon Website

Anime conventions in the United States
Recurring events established in 2001
2001 establishments in Ohio
Annual events in Ohio
Festivals in Ohio
Culture of Columbus, Ohio
Tourist attractions in Columbus, Ohio
Conventions in Ohio